Supun is a Sinhalese masculine given name that may refer to the following notable Sri Lankan cricketers:

Supun Leelaratne (born 1981)
Supun Madushanka (born 1993) 
Supun Withanaarachchi (born 1992)
Supun Tharanga (born 1986)

Sinhalese masculine given names